TSS Train Ferry No. 1 was a roll on roll off freight vessel built for the British War Office in 1917 to transport rail freight to Europe during the First World War .  After the war, it was used for civilian purposes until the Second World War. During the war it was converted to carry and launch landing craft 

After the war, it returned to ferry use and scrapped in the 1950s.

History 
The ship was built by Armstrong, Whitworth & Company, Newcastle upon Tyne and launched in 1917. They were ordered by the British Army to provide rail freight transport from the military Port Richborough to the continent to sustain the war effort eing quicker to load and unload in port. They had four sets of rails along the train deck and used a link span to load when in harbour.

After their use by the British Army ended in 1922, they were purchased by the Great Eastern Railway and moved to Harwich where the landing stage was re-erected to provide a service to Zeebrugge in conjunction with the Belgian Government through a joint company, the Great Eastern Train Ferry Company. The Great Eastern Railway was taken over by the London and North Eastern Railway company in 1923 with its interest in the Great Eastern Train Ferry Company. The new service was inaugurated on 24 April 1924 by the Duke of Kent.

On 13 December 1924 she collided with two lighters in the river near Antwerp but the incident was without loss of life.

In 1934, the Great Eastern Train Ferry Company was liquidated and she was bought by the London and North Eastern Railway.

In 1940 she was requisitioned by the Royal Navy and renamed Iris. She assisted with the evacuation of the Channel Islands. In 1941 she was converted to a Landing Craft Carrier, and the twin funnels were incorporated into a single stack. In 1942 she was renamed again to Princess Iris.

Princess Irish could carry fourteen landing craft on the train deck and four more on the upper deck. Those on the train deck were launched down a chute at the stern (hence classified as "Landing Ship Stern Chute"); those on the upper deck were unloaded by crane, During the war she was mostly used for transporting landing craft.

In 1946 she returned to the London and North Eastern Railway and renamed Essex Ferry. She was in service with British Railways from 1948 until 1956 when she was withdrawn from service, renamed Essex Ferry II and then scrapped in 1957.

Notes

References

Bibliography
 
 
 
 

1917 ships
Steamships of the United Kingdom
Ships built on the River Tyne
Ships of the Great Eastern Railway
Ships of the London and North Eastern Railway
World War II amphibious warfare vessels of the United Kingdom
Train ferries